Saint John's is a teams from Montserrat based in St. Johns.

References

Football clubs in Montserrat